Fencing at the Friendship Games took place at the Budapest Sportcsarnok in Budapest, Hungary between 15 and 21 July 1984. 8 events (6 men's and 2 women's) were contested.

Medal summary

Men's events

Women's events

Medal table

See also
 Fencing at the 1984 Summer Olympics

References

Friendship Games
1984 in fencing
1984 in Hungarian sport
Friendship Games
International sports competitions hosted by Hungary
International sports competitions in Budapest